Mathias Sandorf is a 1979 historical adventure television series based on the Jules Verne novel of the same title. A co-production between France, Hungary, Italy and West Germany it debuted on West Germany's ZDF in December 1979 before receiving a French broadcast the following year.

Partial cast
 István Bujtor as Mathias Sandorf
 Amadeus August as Étienne Bathory
 Ivan Desny as Ladislaus Zathmary
 Jutta Speidel as Rena Sandorf
 Monika Peitsch as Gertrud Toronthal
 Jacques Breuer as Pierre Bathory
 Sissy Höfferer as Sava Toronthal
 Marie-Christine Demarest as Clara Bathory
 Claude Giraud as Silas Toronthal

References

Bibliography
 Bock, Hans-Michael & Bergfelder, Tim. The Concise CineGraph. Encyclopedia of German Cinema. Berghahn Books, 2009.

External links
 

1979 German television series debuts
1979 German television series endings
1980 French television series debuts
1980 French television series endings
French-language television shows
German-language television shows
Films based on Mathias Sandorf
Television shows based on works by Jules Verne